Cephaloon is a genus of false longhorn beetles in the family Stenotrachelidae. There are about 6 described species in Cephaloon.

Species
 Cephaloon bicolor Horn, 1896
 Cephaloon lepturides Newman, 1838 (false leptura beetle)
 Cephaloon pacificum Van Dyke, 1928
 Cephaloon tenuicorne LeConte, 1874
 Cephaloon ungulare LeConte, 1874
 Cephaloon vandykei Hopping & Hopping, 1934

References

 Hopping, Ralph, and George R. Hopping (1934). "A revision of the genus Cephaloon Newm.". The Pan-Pacific Entomologist, vol. 10, no. 2, 64–70.
 Young, Daniel K. / Arnett, Ross H. Jr., Michael C. Thomas, Paul E. Skelley, and J. H. Frank, eds. (2002). "Family 110. Stenotrachelidae Thomson 1859". American Beetles, vol. 2: Polyphaga: Scarabaeoidea through Curculionoidea, 520–521.

Further reading

 Arnett, R. H. Jr., M. C. Thomas, P. E. Skelley and J. H. Frank. (eds.). (21 June 2002). American Beetles, Volume II: Polyphaga: Scarabaeoidea through Curculionoidea. CRC Press LLC, Boca Raton, Florida .
 Arnett, Ross H. (2000). American Insects: A Handbook of the Insects of America North of Mexico. CRC Press.
 Richard E. White. (1983). Peterson Field Guides: Beetles. Houghton Mifflin Company.

Tenebrionoidea